Mark Higgins may refer to:

Mark Higgins (strength athlete) (born 1963), athlete and strongman
Mark Higgins (baseball) (1963–2017), baseball player
Mark Higgins (driver) (born 1971), British rally driver
Mark Higgins (footballer) (born 1958), English former footballer
Mark Huntington Higgins (1940–1960), American helper of Albert Schweitzer